Codon is a genus of planthoppers in the family Fulgoridae, subfamily Stronglyodematinae. Species occur in South Africa.

Species

References

Auchenorrhyncha genera
Fulgoridae